Pasquale Parodi (born 11 April 1909 in Novi Ligure) was an Italian professional football player and coach.

External links

1909 births
Year of death missing
People from Novi Ligure
Italian footballers
Serie A players
Inter Milan players
S.S.C. Bari players
Novara F.C. players
U.S. Alessandria Calcio 1912 players
Italian football managers
U.S. Alessandria Calcio 1912 managers
A.S.D. HSL Derthona players
Association football midfielders
Footballers from Piedmont
Sportspeople from the Province of Alessandria